Calaveras County, officially the County of Calaveras, is a county in both the Gold Country and High Sierra regions of the U.S. state of California. As of the 2010 census, the population was 45,292. The county seat is San Andreas. Angels Camp is the county's only incorporated city. Calaveras is Spanish for "skulls"; the county was reportedly named for the remains of Native Americans discovered by the Spanish explorer Captain Gabriel Moraga.

Calaveras Big Trees State Park, a preserve of giant sequoia trees, is in the county several miles east of the town of Arnold on State Highway 4. Credit for the discovery of giant sequoias there is given to Augustus T. Dowd, a trapper who made the discovery in 1852 while tracking a bear. When the bark from the "Discovery Tree" was removed and taken on tour around the world, the trees became a worldwide sensation and one of the county's first tourist attractions. The uncommon gold telluride mineral calaverite was discovered in the county in 1861 and is named for it.

Mark Twain set his story "The Celebrated Jumping Frog of Calaveras County" in the county. The county hosts an annual fair and Jumping Frog Jubilee, featuring a frog-jumping contest, to celebrate the association with Twain's story. Each year's winner is commemorated with a brass plaque mounted in the sidewalk of downtown Historic Angels Camp and this feature is known as the Frog Hop of Fame.

In 2015, Calaveras County had the highest rate of suicide deaths in the United States, with 49.1 per 100,000 people.

Etymology 
The Spanish word calaveras means "skulls." The county takes its name from the Calaveras River; it was said to have been named by Spanish explorer Gabriel Moraga, during his 1806–1808 expeditions, when he found many skulls of Native Americans along the banks of the stream. He believed they had either died of famine or been killed in tribal conflicts over hunting and fishing grounds. A more likely cause was a European epidemic disease, acquired from interacting with other tribes near the Missions on the coast. The Stanislaus River, which forms the southern boundary, is named for Estanislao, a Lakisamni Yokuts who escaped from Mission San Jose in the late 1830s. He is reported to have raised a small group of men with crude weapons, hiding in the foothills when the Mexicans attacked. The natives were quickly decimated by Mexican gunfire.

In 1836, John Marsh, Jose Noriega, and a party of men went exploring in Northern California. They made camp along a river bed in the evening, and upon waking discovered that they had camped amid a great quantity of skulls and bones. They also gave the river the name Calaveras. 
  
Twain spent 88 days in the county in 1865, during which he heard the story that became "The Celebrated Jumping Frog of Calaveras County" at the Angel Hotel. This story kicked off his career and put Calaveras County on the map.

History
Calaveras County was one of the original counties of the state of California, created in 1850 at the time of admission to the Union. Parts of the county's territory were reassigned to Amador County in 1854 and to Alpine County in 1864.

The county's geography includes beautiful landmarks, rolling hills, and giant valleys. It is also known for its friendly communities, and businesses such as agriculture management and construction engineering. It has numerous caverns, such as Mercer Caverns, California Cavern and Moaning Cavern that are national destinations for tourists from across the country. Other attractions include a thriving wine making industry, including the largest of the Calaveras wineries: Ironstone Vineyards, mountain sports recreation and the performing arts.

Gold prospecting in Calaveras County began in late 1848 with a camp founded by Henry Angel. Angel may have first arrived in California as a soldier, serving under Colonel Frémont during the Mexican War. After the war's end, he found himself in Monterey where he heard of the fabulous finds in the gold fields. He joined the Carson-Robinson party of prospectors and set out for the mines. The company parted ways upon reaching what later became known as Angels Creek. Henry Angel tried placer mining but soon opened a trading post. By the end of the year, over one hundred tents were scattered about the creek and the settlement was referred to as Angels Trading Post, later shortened to Angels Camp.

Placer mining soon gave out around the camp, but an extensive gold-bearing quartz vein of the area's Mother Lode was located by the Winter brothers during the mid-1850s, and this brought in the foundations of a permanent town. This vein followed Main Street from Angels Creek up to the southern edge of Altaville. Five major mines worked the rich vein: the Stickle, the Utica, the Lightner, the Angels, and the Sultana. These mines reached their peaks during the 1880s and 1890s, when over 200 stamp mills crushed quartz ore brought in by hand cars on track from the mines. By the time hard rock mining was done, the five mines had producing a total of over $20 million in gold.

The telluride mineral calaverite was first recognized and obtained in 1861 from the Stanislaus Mine, Carson Hill, Angels Camp, in Calaveras Co., California. It was named for the County of origin by chemist and mineralogist Frederick Augustus Genth who differentiated it from the known gold telluride mineral sylvanite, and formally reported it as a new gold mineral in 1868.

Geography

A California Department of Forestry report lists the county's area in acres as 663,000, although the exact figure would be . There are a number of caverns located in Calaveras County.

Adjacent counties
 Amador County – north
 Alpine County – northeast
 Tuolumne County – south
 Stanislaus County – southwest
 San Joaquin County – west

National protected area
 Stanislaus National Forest (part)

Demographics

2020 census

Note: the US Census treats Hispanic/Latino as an ethnic category. This table excludes Latinos from the racial categories and assigns them to a separate category. Hispanics/Latinos can be of any race.

2011

Places by population, race, and income

2010 Census
The 2010 United States Census reported that Calaveras County had a population of 45,578. The racial makeup of Calaveras County was 40,522 (88.9%) White, 383 (0.8%) African American, 689 (1.5%) Native American, 571 (1.3%) Asian, 79 (0.2%) Pacific Islander, 1,534 (3.4%) from other races, and 1,800 (3.9%) from two or more races. Hispanic or Latino of any race were 4,703 persons (10.3%).

2000
As of the census of 2000, there were 40,554 people, 16,469 households, and 11,742 families residing in the county. The population density was 40 people per square mile (15/km2). There were 22,946 housing units at an average density of 22 per square mile (9/km2). The racial makeup of the county was 91.2% White, 0.8% Black or African American, 1.7% Native American, 0.9% Asian, 0.1% Pacific Islander, 2.1% from other races, and 3.3% from two or more races. 6.8% of the population were Hispanic or Latino of any race. 15.7% were of German, 13.0% English, 10.7% Irish, 7.4% Italian and 7.0% American ancestry according to Census 2000. 94.5% spoke English and 4.0% Spanish as their first language.

There were 16,469 households, out of which 26.7% had children under the age of 18 living with them, 58.9% were married couples living together, 8.6% had a female householder with no husband present, and 28.7% were non-families. 23.3% of all households were made up of individuals, and 10.1% had someone living alone who was 65 years of age or older. The average household size was 2.44 and the average family size was 2.85.

In the county, the population was spread out, with 22.8% under the age of 18, 5.5% from 18 to 24, 22.4% from 25 to 44, 31.1% from 45 to 64, and 18.2% who were 65 years of age or older. The median age was 45 years. For every 100 females there were 98.5 males. For every 100 females age 18 and over, there were 95.7 males.

The median income for a household in the county was $41,022, and the median income for a family was $47,379. Males had a median income of $41,827 versus $28,108 for females. The per capita income for the county was $21,420. About 8.7% of families and 11.80% of the population were below the poverty line, including 15.6% of those under age 18 and 6.2% of those age 65 or over.

Economy
The major Calaveras County employers include:

250–499 employees:
 Calaveras County Government
 Forestry & Fire Protection
 Mark Twain St. Joseph's Hospital
100–249 employees:
 Bret Harte Union High School
 Ironstone Vineyards
 Calaveras High School
 Mark Twain Convalescent Hospital
 Mountain Machinery

Government
Calaveras County is governed by a five-member Board of Supervisors.
Supervisors are elected by district at the Consolidated Primary Election and serve for four years.
Current Board of Supervisors: 
Gary Tofanelli (District 1); Jack Garamendi (District 2); Merita Callaway (District 3); Dennis Mills (District 4) and Benjamin Stopper (District 5). 
In January 2020 Merita Callaway was elected Chair of the Board and Ben Stopper was elected Vice Chair. Albert Alt is the County Administrative Officer and Sarah DeKay is the interim County Counsel. Both are appointed by and serve at the pleasure of the Board of Supervisors.

Elections and politics

Voter registration statistics

Cities by population and voter registration

Overview 

Past presidential elections in Calaveras County have displayed preferences for Republican candidates; the last Democrat to win a majority in the county was Lyndon Johnson in 1964, although Democrat Bill Clinton lost the county by only 17 votes in 1992. By contrast, recent elections have seen a sharp upswing in Democratic voter registrations.

Crime 

The following table includes the number of incidents reported and the rate per 1,000 persons for each type of offense.

Cities by population and crime rates

Transportation

Major highways
 State Route 4
 State Route 12
 State Route 26
 State Route 49

Public transportation
Calaveras Transit provides service in Angels Camp, San Andreas, and other communities in the county. Intercounty connections are available to Columbia (Tuolumne County), Jackson (Amador County), and Lodi (San Joaquin County).

Airports
Calaveras County Airport is a general aviation airport located just southeast of San Andreas.

Communities

Cities
Angels Camp is the only incorporated city located in Calaveras County.

Census-designated places

Arnold
Avery
Copperopolis
Dorrington
Forest Meadows
Mokelumne Hill
Mountain Ranch
Murphys
Rail Road Flat
Rancho Calaveras
San Andreas (county seat)
Vallecito
Valley Springs
Wallace
West Point

Other communities
Glencoe
Sheep Ranch
Cave City
Milton

Former settlements
Camanche
Cat Camp
Poverty Bar
Sand Hill

Special districts

 Altaville Cemetery District
 Altaville-Melones Fire District
 Angels Camp Fire District
 Bret Harte Union High School District
 Calaveras County Air Pollution Control District
 Calaveras Unified School District
 Central Calaveras Fire and Rescue Protection District
 Copperopolis Fire Protection District
 Ebbetts Pass Fire Protection District
 Foothill Fire District
 Jenny Lind Fire District
 Mark Twain Health Care District 
 Mark Twain Union Elementary School District
 Mokelumne Hill Fire District
 Murphys Fire District
 San Andreas Fire District
 Vallecito Union Elementary School District
 Valley Springs Public Utilities District
 West Point Fire District.

Population ranking

The population ranking of the following table is based on the 2010 census of Calaveras County.

† county seat

See also 
 USS Calaveras County (LST-516)
 List of school districts in Calaveras County, California
 Calaveras Big Trees State Park
 Mercer Caverns
 Moaning Cavern
 National Register of Historic Places listings in Calaveras County, California

Notes

References

Further reading
 A Memorial and Biographical History of the Counties of Merced, Stanislaus, Calaveras, Tuolumne and Mariposa, California. Chicago: Lewis Publishing Co., 1892.
 "Tuolumne-Calaveras Unit: 2005 Pre-Fire Management Plan September 28, 2005 Edition," California Department of Forestry and Fire Protection, Sep 28, 2005, pp. 16, 17
 United States Department of Education, National Center for Education Statistics.

External links

Calaveras County Visitors Bureau
Angels Camp, Calaveras County, weather
Arnold, Calaveras County, weather
Calaveras County Superior Court
Map of fire stations in Calaveras County

 

 
California counties
1850 establishments in California
Populated places established in 1850